Peleg Sprague (December 10, 1756 – April 20, 1800) was a politician from the U.S. state of New Hampshire.

Sprague was born in Rochester in the Province of Massachusetts Bay. He clerked in a store in Littleton, attended Harvard College, and was graduated from Dartmouth College, Hanover, New Hampshire, in 1783. He studied law, was admitted to the bar in 1785, and commenced practice in Winchendon, Massachusetts. He moved to Keene, New Hampshire, in 1787. He was selectman 1789-1791; county solicitor for Cheshire County in 1794; and member of the New Hampshire House of Representatives in 1797.

Sprague was elected as a Federalist Party to the 5th United States Congress to fill the vacancy caused by the resignation of Jeremiah Smith, serving from December 15, 1797, to March 3, 1799. He declined to be a candidate for renomination in 1798.

Sprague died in Keene, New Hampshire, and was interred there in the Washington Street Cemetery.

References

The Political Graveyard

External links

 

1756 births
1800 deaths
Members of the New Hampshire House of Representatives
Dartmouth College alumni
Harvard College alumni
Federalist Party members of the United States House of Representatives from New Hampshire
People from Littleton, Massachusetts
18th-century American politicians